Colonial Secretary may refer to:

 Secretary of State for the Colonies, the British Cabinet minister who headed the Colonial Office, commonly referred to as Colonial Secretary
 Chief secretary (British Empire), originally colonial secretary, the official in many British colonies who headed the day-to-day functions of the colony's government, deputy to the governor
 Colonial Secretary of Ceylon, one of six offices that held a seat in the Executive Council of Ceylon
 Colonial Secretary (New Zealand), the chief administrator of New Zealand from 1840 to 1907
 Chief Secretary (Hong Kong), renamed from the Colonial Secretary in 1976
 Chief Secretary, Singapore, renamed from the Colonial Secretary in 1955
 Colonial Secretary of New South Wales from 1821 to 1959 when the role was renamed to Chief Secretary
 Colonial Secretary of South Australia, from 1836 to 1856 when the role was renamed to Chief Secretary
 Colonial Secretary of Tasmania, from 1856 to 1873, previously Colonial Secretary of Van Diemen's Land from 1826 to 1856
 Colonial Secretary of Western Australia, from 1828 to 1924

See also
 Provincial Secretary